Saltash West is an electoral division of Cornwall in the United Kingdom and returns one member to sit on Cornwall Council. The current Councillor is Sam Tamlin, a Liberal Democrat.

Extent
Saltash West covers the west of the town of Saltash, including the suburb of Burraton Coombe and part of the suburb of St Stephens (which is shared with the Saltash South division), as well as the villages of Forder and Trematon, and the hamlets of Antony Passage, Trehan and Trevollard. The division covers 1,385 hectares in total.

Election results

2017 election

2013 election

References

Electoral divisions of Cornwall Council